The Phalangiidae are a family of harvestmen with about 380 known species. The best known is Phalangium opilio. Dicranopalpus ramosus is an invasive species in Europe.

It is not to be confused with the harvestman family Phalangodidae, which belongs to the suborder Laniatores.

Name
The name of the type genus is derived from Ancient Greek phalangion "harvestman".

Systematics
 Dicranopalpinae
 Amilenus Martens, 1969 (1 species; central Europe)
 Dicranopalpus Doleschall, 1852 (12 species; Europe, South America)
 Lanthanopilio Cokendolpher & Cokendolpher, 1984 (1 species)
 Oligolophinae Banks, 1893
 Lacinius Thorell, 1876 (17 species; China, Europe, North America)
 Mitopiella Banks, 1930 (1 species; Borneo)
 Mitopus Thorell, 1876 (9 species; Eurasia, North America)
 Odiellus Roewer, 1923 (17 species; Eurasia, North Africa, North America)
 Oligolophus C. L. Koch, 1871 (4 species; Europe, China)
 Paralacinius Morin, 1934 (1 species)
 Paroligolophus Lohmander, 1945 (2 species; continental Europe and Britain)
 Roeweritta Silhavý, 1965 (1 species)
 Opilioninae C.L. Koch, 1839
 Egaenus C.L. Koch, in Hahn & C.L. Koch 1839 (14 species; Eurasia)
 Himalphalangium Martens, 1973 (5 species)
 Homolophus Banks, 1893 (25 species; central Asia, North America)
 Opilio Herbst, 1798 (63 species; Eurasia, one species also in North America)
 Scleropilio Roewer, 1911 (1 species; central Asia)
 Phalangiinae Latreille, 1802
 Acanthomegabunus Tsurusaki, Tchemeris & Logunov, 2000 (1 species; Siberia)
 Bactrophalangium Silhavý, 1966 (2 species)
 Bunochelis Roewer, 1923 (2 species; Canary Islands)
 Coptophalangium Starega, 1984 (1 species)
 Cristina Loman, 1902 (13 species; Africa)
 Dacnopilio Roewer, 1911 (4 species; Africa)
 Dasylobus Simon, 1878 (19 species; southern Europe, northern Africa)
 Graecophalangium Roewer, 1923 (5 species; Greece, Macedonia)
 Guruia Loman, 1902 (5 species; Africa)
 Hindreus Kauri, 1985 (3 species; Africa)
 Leptobunus Banks, 1893 (5 species; North America)
 Liopilio Schenkel, 1951 (2 species; Alaska)
 Liropilio Gritsenko, 1979 (2 species; Russia, Kazakhstan)
 Megistobunus Hansen, 1921 (3 species)
 Metadasylobus Roewer, 1911 (8 species; Balkans, Greece, Canary Islands, France, Spain)
 Metaphalangium Roewer, 1911 (15 species; southern Europe, northern Africa, Asia Minor, Canary Islands)
 Odontobunus Roewer, 1910 (9 species; Africa)
 Parascleropilio Rambla, 1975 (1 species)
 Phalangium Linnaeus, 1758 (35 species; Africa, Eurasia, Cuba)
 Ramblinus Starega, 1984 (1 species; Madeira)
 Rhampsinitus Simon, 1879 (47 species; Africa)
 Rilaena Silhavý, 1965 (8 species; Europe)
 Tchapinius Roewer, 1929 (1 species; Kamchatka)
 Zachaeus C.L. Koch, 1839 (10 species; southeastern Europe, Asia Minor)
 Platybuninae Starega, 1976
 Buresilia Silhavý, 1965 (2 species)
 Lophopilio Hadzi, 1931 (2 species)
 Megabunus Meade, 1855 (6 species; Europe)
 Metaplatybunus Roewer, 1911 (8 species; Greece)
 Paraplatybunus Dumitrescu, 1970 (2 species)
 Platybunoides Silhavý, 1956 (1 species)
 Platybunus C.L. Koch, 1839 (22 species; Europe, Sumatra)
 Rafalskia Starega, 1963 (1 species; Asia minor)
 Stankiella Hadzi, 1973 (2 species)

Footnotes

References
 Joel Hallan's Biology Catalog: Phalangiidae
  (eds.) (2007): Harvestmen - The Biology of Opiliones. Harvard University Press 

Harvestmen
Harvestman families